Liang Shuyan (born September 16, 1977 in Heilongjiang) is a retired Chinese long jumper. Her personal best jump was 6.71 metres, achieved in July 2004 in Manila.

At the 2004 Summer Olympics she was eliminated in the first round of the long jump competition.

Achievements

References

1977 births
Living people
Athletes (track and field) at the 2004 Summer Olympics
Chinese female long jumpers
Olympic athletes of China
Athletes from Heilongjiang
21st-century Chinese women